Human Factors is a peer-reviewed academic journal that publishes scientific studies in ergonomics. The editor-in-chief is Patricia R. DeLucia (Rice University). It was established in 1958 and is published by SAGE Publications in association with the Human Factors and Ergonomics Society.

Abstracting and indexing 
The journal is abstracted and indexed in Scopus and the Social Sciences Citation Index. According to the Journal Citation Reports, the journal has a 2019 impact factor of 3.165.

References

External links 
 

SAGE Publishing academic journals
English-language journals
Bimonthly journals
Occupational safety and health journals
Publications established in 1958